Nokwanje Selina "Mathabo" Leeto is a South African politician who has been the Member of the Executive Council (MEC) for Health in the Executive Council of the Free State and a Member of the Free State Provincial Legislature since 2023. Leeto had previously served in the provincial legislature between 2014 and 2019 and during that time, she was the MEC for Sports, Arts, Culture and Recreation. Leeto is the Provincial Treasurer of the African National Congress, as of 2023.

Background
Leeto served as a ward councillor for the African National Congress and as a member of the National Executive Committee of the women's league. She was the mayor of the Matjhabeng Local Municipality, before becoming the mayor of the Lejweleputswa District Municipality in 2011. After her swearing-in as district mayor, it was revealed that the municipality spent R640 000 on her inauguration ceremony instead of extending a job-creation programme. In June 2012, Leeto was elected as chairperson of the ANC's Lejweleputswa Region.

Free State provincial government

MEC for Sports, Arts, Culture and Recreation: 2014–2019
Leeto was elected to the Free State Provincial Legislature in the 2014 general election as the ANC won 22 seats in the legislature. She was then appointed by premier Ace Magashule to the Executive Council of the Free State as the Member of the Executive Council (MEC) for Sports, Arts, Culture and Recreation, succeeding Dan Kgothule who was not re-elected to the provincial legislature.

She remained as MEC for Sports, Arts, Culture and Recreation following Sisi Ntombela's election as Premier of the Free State. In early-March 2019, Leeto was elcted president of the  South African National Civic Organisation (Sanco). The following month, Sanco accused Magashule of moving Leeto down the ANC's national party list to prevent her from joining Parliament following the May 8, 2019 general elections. Leeto was not elected to parliament and left the provincial legislature.

MEC for Health: 2023
Leeto was sworn in as a Member of the Free State Provincial Legislature on 13 March 2023. The following day, newly elected premier Mxolisi Dukwana announced his Executive Council which saw Leeto replace Montseng Tsiu as MEC for Health.

In the provincial ANC
After Magashule was elected Secretary-General of the African National Congress, a position which required that he must resign premier of the Free State, in December 2017, Leeto and the MEC for Police‚ Roads and Transport Sam Mashinini was reportedly seen as favourites to succeed Magashule as the ANC provincial chairperson in the Free State. Leeto was accused of being a Magashule loyalist, which she has subsequently refuted. Mashinini was elected provincial chairperson at the party's conference in May 2018.

Provincial treasurer of the ANC
Leeto was elected as the provincial treasurer of the ANC at the party's elective conference in January 2023, defeating staunch Magashule supporter Vusi Tshabalala.

Controversies

Tenure as Matjhabeng mayor
Leeto and Health MEC Benny Malakoane appeared in the Welkom Regional Court on 1 August 2014 on fraud and corruption charges relating to Malakoane's tenure as Matjhabeng municipal manager while Leeto served as the municipality's mayor; the case was transferred to the Bloemfontein Regional Court. Their trial officially began in November 2015. Leeto was acquitted on more than 200 charges of fraud, corruption, money laundering and accepting bribes dating back to her tenure as Matjhabeng mayor on 4 November 2016 after she wrote to the National Prosecuting Authority requesting them to review all the charges against her.

Leeto and Bloem Water CEO Limakatso Moorosi were arrested by The Hawks for fraud and corruption on 16 February 2018 dating back to her tenure as Matjhabeng mayor. She had allegedly awarded a tender worth millions of rands for the procurement and installation of telephone systems, CCTV cameras, photocopy machines without following the correct tender procedures as stipulated by law and she and Moorosi reportedly received kickbacks; the NPA later withdrew the charges due to the low chances of success.

Comments during Women's Day debate
During a debate in the legislature on Women's Day in the legislature in August 2018, Leeto was accused of saying that when Dutch navigator Jan van Riebeeck arrived in the Cape was when all the trouble started in South Africa and that all white men are rapists and they should be exhumed from their graves to account. She had earlier been accused of calling the DA leader in the legislature Roy Jankielsohn "a piece of faeces"; she denied this and said that the translator misheard her when she was speaking Sesotho. Afrikaner lobby group AfriForum subsequently called for her dismissal. Leeto denied making the comments and said that she was not a racist person.

Personal life
Leeto is a resident of Odendaalsrus.

References

Living people
Year of birth missing (living people)
Sotho people
African National Congress politicians
Members of the Free State Provincial Legislature
Women members of provincial legislatures of South Africa